Kenneth Ramon Kluivert is a Surinamese former footballer who played as a left winger for S.V. Robinhood in the SVB Hoofdklasse, and for the Suriname national football team.

He is the father of former Dutch International football player and manager Patrick Kluivert and the grandfather of A.S. Roma player Justin Kluivert.

Club career
Born in Moengo, Kluivert began his senior football career in the SVB Hoofdklasse playing for S.V. Robinhood from Paramaribo. Playing on the left wing, Kluivert was a star in his native Suriname, where he would finish the season as top scorer of Robinhood on several occasions. Commonly known by his nickname "Bossa Nova", Kluivert was renown for his crosses into the box, his free kicks and his goal scoring abilities.  Together with Edwin Schal and Gerrit Niekoop he would form the dangerous attack of Robinhood, only rivaled by S.V. Transvaal at the time, during a period which helped shape the footballing landscape in the country, and the Surinaamse Klassieker, the strongest rivalry in Suriname.  In 1970, Kluivert relocated to the Netherlands with his family. He was considered one of the best players in the club's history. During his tenure with Robinhood, he helped his club to two national titles in 1961 and 1964 in a period which was dominated by rivals Transvaal. He later played for the amateur football club Real Sranang in the Netherlands.

International career
Kluivert played for the Suriname national football team. On 20 March 1964 he made his first appearance in an official match, playing in the 1964 Summer Olympics qualifiers against Panama, in a 6–1 win, scoring the opener on his debut. He scored his second goal on 14 March 1965 against Trinidad and Tobago, in a 1966 FIFA World Cup qualification match at home which ended in a 6–1 win once more.

Personal life
Kluivert was married to Lidwina and is now married to Jolanda. His ex-wife was born in Willemstad, Curaçao, in the former Netherlands Antilles to a Surinamese father and a Curaçaoan  mother, moving to Suriname at age 23 where she met Kenneth. Their first son Renato, and their daughter Natascia were born in Suriname, before the family relocated to Amsterdam, Netherlands in 1970, where Patrick Kluivert was born six years later. Their youngest son Patrick, was recruited to the Ajax Youth Academy at age 5 where he progressed through the ranks, becoming one of the most successful players in Dutch football history, finishing his playing career as top scorer of the Dutch national team. Patrick's son, Kluivert's grandson, Justin is also a graduate of the Ajax Youth Academy and was also capped by the national team.

Career statistics

International goals
Scores and results list Suriname' goal tally first.

Honours

Club
S.V. Robinhood
 Hoofdklasse (2): 1961, 1964

References 

Living people
1941 births
Surinamese footballers
Suriname international footballers
SVB Eerste Divisie players
S.V. Robinhood players
Surinamese expatriate footballers
Expatriate footballers in the Netherlands
Surinamese emigrants to the Netherlands
Association football wingers
Kenneth